University of Travnik (Bosnian: Univerzitet u Travniku, UNT) is a private university located in Travnik, Bosnia and Herzegovina. The university was established in 2007. The motto of the university is— "Science to Success".

Courses 
The university offers both undergraduate and post-graduate courses. Some of the courses offered by the university are—
 Law and legal science related courses at the University of Travnik Faculty of Law for the I, II and III cycles of study
General Management
 Management in the Banking and Insurance
 Tourism and Hospitality 
 Pharmaceutical direction
 Dental medicine direction
 Radiological direction
 General medical direction - Medical nursing 
 Teacher training
 Bosanski / Hrvastki / Serbian Language and Literature 
 Class teaching and Bosnian / Hrvastki / Serbian Language and Literature
 Mathematics and Computer Science
 Pre-school education
 Pedagogy and Psychology
 The general kinesiology 
 Specific Applications
 Sports - coaching
 Sports Management
 Graphic design
 Graphic Engineering
 Multimedia Engineering

References

External links 
 

Universities in Bosnia and Herzegovina
Educational institutions established in 2007
2007 establishments in Bosnia and Herzegovina